CWK may refer to:

Cold War Kids, an American indie rock band from Long Beach, California
.cwk, a file extension of AppleWorks (ClarisWorks) files